Rustam Haidar (1889 in Baalbek – 22 January 1940) was a politician and an aide to Emir Faisal who served as the Defense Minister and Finance Minister of Iraq. He was Minister of Finance from 1930 to 1932 and from 1938 to 1940. A Shia of Lebanese descent, he was targeted by other leading politicians for his faith.

On January 18, 1940, Hussein Fawzi Tawfik shot Rustam Haidar three times; he died four days later in hospital from his wounds.

References

1889 births
1940 deaths
Finance ministers of Iraq
Assassinated people
Iraqi politicians
Shia–Sunni sectarian violence
Iraqi Shia Muslims
Iraqi people of Lebanese descent
Deaths by firearm in Iraq